William Giraldi is an American writer, critic, and journalist. In 2021, he  was awarded a Guggenheim  Fellowship at Boston University, where he is a Master Lecturer in the Arts & Sciences Writing Program, and an editor for the journal AGNI.<ref>Contributors: William Giraldi at Los Angeles Review of Books.</ref>

Giraldi is a contributing editor at The New Republic''.

Books
Novels

Literary criticism

References

Citations

Works cited

External links

William Girardi at Boston University

American critics
American journalists
American writers